Eric Stephens (23 March 1909 – 3 April 1983) was an English cricketer. He played for Gloucestershire between 1927 and 1937.

References

External links

1909 births
1983 deaths
English cricketers
Gloucestershire cricketers
Cricketers from Gloucester